Apna Desh Paraye Log  is a 1989 Bollywood film directed by Pradeep Hooda and starring Sumeet Saigal, Sonu Walia, Moon Moon Sen, Suresh Oberoi, Om Shivpuri and Sadashiv Amrapurkar.

Cast
 Sumeet Saigal as Abhimanyu
 Sonu Walia as Geeta
 Moon Moon Sen as Shaarda Kumar
 Suresh Oberoi as Dinesh Kumar
 Jamuna as Abhi's Mother
 Sadashiv Amrapurkar as Ranganathan
 Ishrat Ali as Neta Banarsi Das
 Bharat Kapoor as Inspector Anil Sharma
 Om Shivpuri as Seth Ramji Das
 Mangal Dhillon as Advocate Sharma
 Dan Dhanoa as Ranga
 Tina Ghai as Journalist Sunita
 Sudhir Dalvi as Sunita's Father
 Atlee Brar as Khairu

Soundtrack

References

External Links
 

1980s Hindi-language films
1989 films
Films scored by Usha Khanna